Heritage Malta is the Maltese national agency for museums, conservation practice and cultural heritage. Created by the Cultural Heritage Act, enacted in 2002, the national agency replaced the former Museums Department.

Originally Heritage Malta was entrusted with the management of museums, sites and their collections but in 2005, the agency was also charged with the take over of the former Malta Centre for Restoration to become the national agency responsible for conservation.

As the national agency responsible for museums, cultural heritage and conservation, Heritage Malta is governed by a board of directors appointed by the minister. The board is headed by a chairman and is usually appointed for successive three-year terms.

Logo
Until 2022, the logo of Heritage Malta consisted of a white uppercase Ħ on a red square. The H with stroke is a letter found only in the Maltese alphabet. In 2022, Heritage Malta changed its logo to a stylized lowercase "M" featuring the H in the middle.

Sites protected by Heritage Malta

The following archaeological sites and historical buildings and structures are under the management of Heritage Malta. All Maltese megalithic temples listed below are inscribed on the UNESCO World Heritage List.

Museums run by Heritage Malta

 Gozo Museum of Archaeology, Citadella at Victoria, Gozo
 Gran Castello Historic House, Citadella at Victoria, Gozo
 National Museum of Ethnography, Birgu
 Malta Maritime Museum, Birgu
 National Museum of Fine Arts, Valletta
 National Museum of Archaeology, Valletta
 National Museum of Natural History, Mdina
 National War Museum, Valletta
 Natural Science Museum, Citadella at Victoria, Gozo
 Old Prison, Citadella at Victoria, Gozo
 Palace Armoury, Valletta
 Domvs Romana, Rabat
 Ta' Kola Windmill, Xagħra, Gozo

References

External links
 

Historic sites in Malta
National heritage organizations
History organisations based in Malta
Historic preservation in Malta